Rix is surname with German origins.

Notable people with the surname include:

 Brian Rix (1924–2016), English actor and charity worker
 Carl Barnett Rix (1908 - 1946), President of the Milwaukee Bar Association, President of the Wisconsin State Bar, President of the American Bar Association
 Chastina Rix (1881–1963), later known as Christine Sterling
 Chris Rix, American football quarterback, coach and sportscaster
 Donald Rix, Canadian pathologist and philanthropist
 Felice Rix (1893–1967), Austrian-born textile, wallpaper, and craft designer who lived in Japan
 Graham Rix, English football player, coach and sex offender
 Grant Rix, Australian rugby league footballer
 Hans-Walter Rix, German astronomer
 Helmut Rix (1926–2004), German language professor
 Hilda Rix Nicholas (1884–1961), née Rix, Australian artist
 Jemma Rix, Australian theatre performer
 Martyn Rix, British botanist and horticulturalist, editor of Curtis's Botanical Magazine
 Robert Rix, British founding figure of shipbuilder and shipowner J.R. Rix & Sons Ltd
 Simon Rix, bass player for British band Kaiser Chiefs
 Sönke Rix (born 1975), German politician
 Tyler Rix, English saxophonist
 Jonathan Rix (born 1960) British academic and author
 Jamie Rix (born 1958), British children's author and TV producer
 Louisa Rix (born 1955), British actress and interior designer

See also
 Rix (disambiguation)

Surnames from given names